William Morrison Charlap (born October 15, 1966, pronounced "Shar-Lap") is an American jazz pianist. In 2016, The Silver Lining: The Songs of Jerome Kern, an album produced by Charlap and Tony Bennett, won the award for Best Traditional Pop Vocal Album at the 58th Annual Grammy Awards.

Early life and education
Born in New York City, Bill Charlap comes from a musical background. His father was the composer Moose Charlap. His mother, Sandy Stewart, is a singer who was a regular on Perry Como's Kraft Music Hall television series and had a hit recording in 1962 with "My Coloring Book". Charlap is a distant cousin of the jazz pianist Dick Hyman.

Charlap began playing piano at the age of three. He studied classical music, but his career has been in jazz.

Career
Charlap recorded Love Is Here to Stay (2004) and Something to Remember (2012) with his mother, Sandy Stewart. His albums  Somewhere, featuring the music of Leonard Bernstein, and Live at The Village Vanguard received Grammy Award nominations.

He has worked with Gerry Mulligan, Benny Carter, Tony Bennett, Phil Woods, Scott Hamilton and others. In the mid-1990s, he was the musical director of Midnight in the Garden of Good and Evil, A Celebration of Johnny Mercer, part of New York's JVC Jazz Festival. In 1995, he joined the Phil Woods Quintet.

Charlap appears at least twice a year for engagements at jazz clubs, including the Village Vanguard, with his rhythm section, consisting of Peter Washington (double bass) and Kenny Washington (drums) (the two are not related to each other). Since 2001, he has recorded as a member of the New York Trio for the Japanese label Venus Records. The other members of the New York Trio are bassist Jay Leonhart and drummer Bill Stewart.

Charlap succeeded Dick Hyman as Artistic Director of New York City's 92nd Street Y Jazz in July six-program series after Hyman's 20th year in 2004. He and his wife, Canadian jazz pianist Renee Rosnes, released an album of piano duets Double Portrait on Blue Note Records/EMI.

In 2008, Charlap became part of The Blue Note 7, a septet formed that year in honor of the 70th anniversary of Blue Note Records. The group recorded an album in 2008, Mosaic, which was released in 2009 on Blue Note/EMI, and toured the United States in promotion of the album from January to April 2009. The group plays the music of Blue Note Records from various artists, with arrangements by members of the band and his wife Renee Rosnes.

In September 2015, Charlap became the Director of Jazz Studies at William Paterson University in Wayne, New Jersey.

Personal life
He married the Canadian jazz pianist Renee Rosnes in New York City on August 25, 2007. He has two daughters from a previous marriage and one stepson from Rosnes’ previous marriage to Billy Drummond.

Discography

As leader or co-leader

As a member 
The Blue Note 7
 Mosaic: A Celebration of Blue Note Records (Blue Note, 2009) – recorded in 2008

Other Blue Note appearances
 Bill Charlap, Elvis Costello, Hank Jones, Joe Lovano, Dianne Reeves, Billy Strayhorn: Lush Life (Blue Note, 2007) – compositions of Billy Strayhorn

As sideman 

With Harry Allen
 Harry Allen Plays Ellington Songs with the Bill Charlap Trio (RCA Victor, 2000) – recorded in 1999
 Blues for Pres and Teddy (Swingbros, 2011)

With Phil Woods
 1997: Chasin' the Bird (Venus, 1998)
 2000: Voyage with the Bill Charlap Trio at the Floating Jazz Festival Aboard the QE2 (Chiaroscuro, 2001)
 2002: The Thrill is Gone with strings (Venus, 2003)
 2002: The Great American Songbook, Volumes 1 & 2 (Kind of Blue, 2006)

With others
 Ruby Braff, You Brought a New Kind of Love (Arbors, 2004)
 Johnny Frigo, Johnny Frigo's DNA Exposed! (Arbors, 2001)
 With Jon Gordon, Spark (Chiaroscuro, 1995)
 Scott Hamilton, Back to New York (Concord Jazz, 2005)
 Jay Leonhart, Great Duets (Chiaroscuro, 1999)
 Brian Lynch, Brian Lynch Meets Bill Charlap (Sharp Nine, 2003)
 Gerry Mulligan, Lonesome Boulevard (Verve, 2009)
 the Joe Roccisano Orchestra, Leave Your Mind Behind (Landmark, 1995)
 Carol Sloane, When I Look in Your Eyes  (Concord, 1994)
 Sean Smith, LIVE! (Chiaroscuro, 1999)
 Grant Stewart, Grant Stewart + 4 (VideoArts, 2005) – recorded in 2004
 Warren Vaché, Dream Dancing (Arbors, 2004) – recorded in 2003

References

External links
 Biography at All About Jazz
 Official Website

American jazz pianists
Fiorello H. LaGuardia High School alumni
Musicians from New York City
People from West Orange, New Jersey
State University of New York at Purchase alumni
1966 births
Living people
Blue Note Records artists
Impulse! Records artists
20th-century American pianists
Jazz musicians from New York (state)
American male pianists
21st-century American pianists
20th-century American male musicians
21st-century American male musicians
American male jazz musicians
American people of Jewish descent
The Blue Note 7 members
Nagel-Heyer Records artists
Venus Records artists
Double-Time Records artists
Criss Cross Jazz artists
Chiaroscuro Records artists